Iotyrris conotaxis is a species of sea snail, a marine gastropod mollusk in the family Turridae, the turrids.

Distribution
This marine species occurs off Cebu, the Philippines at depths between 15 mm and 20 m.

References

External links
 
 Abdelkrim, J.; Aznar-Cormano, L.; Buge, B.; Fedosov, A.; Kantor, Y.; Zaharias, P.; Puillandre, N. (2018). Delimiting species of marine gastropods (Turridae, Conoidea) using RAD sequencing in an integrative taxonomy framework. Molecular Ecology. 27(22): 4591-4611
 MNHN, Paris: paratype

conotaxis
Gastropods described in 2018